Bristol Roller Derby (BRD) is a roller derby league based in Bristol. Founded in 2010, the league consists of two women's roller derby teams, a men's team, a Co-Ed team and a fledgling juniors team.

History
The league was founded early in 2010 by Tuisku Sarrala, Anna Wong, Laura Phillips, Laura Lopez, Maria Cormack, Simone Bennett and Verona. Anna Wong, who had previously played the sport in New Zealand, became the league's head coach for the inaugural year, before returning to New Zealand in January 2011. Originally known as the Bristol Harbour Harlots, that title is now reserved for its travel team. By mid-2011, the league had more than seventy skaters, and had hosted a sell-out bout.

One of the league's founder members, Tuisku Sarrala (derby name The Blizzard), competed for Team Finland at the 2011 Roller Derby World Cup.

On 1 November 2012, Bristol Roller Derby merged with another local roller derby team, Anarchic Die Hard Derby (ADHD). ADHD's founders were skaters who were unable to join Bristol Roller Derby during a period in which Bristol's recruitment was closed. Following the merger, ADHD became Bristol's fourth home team, bringing the number of active skaters to over 50. Together with officials, the Fresh Meat intake of October 2012, and non-skating members, the league membership stood at over 100 members at the beginning of November 2012.

In December 2012, the league was accepted as a member of the United Kingdom Roller Derby Association.

In 2016, they were discussed in an article on bears associated with Bristol, in which members Grizzly and Bear Thrylls featured.

League Structure

Travel Teams

 Bristol Roller Derby A (women's, previously known as The Harbour Harlots).
 Bristol Roller Derby B (women's, referred to as The Bees).
 Vice Quad (men's team)
 Bristol All-Stars (co-ed)

Home Teams
The league has four women's home teams:

 ADHD
 Daughters of Anarchy
 Project Mayhem
 Smash Vandals

Drop in Derby 
"Drop In Derby" sessions are run for anyone over 11 wanting to skate or learn roller derby. Unlike other training sessions organised by the league, attendees do not have to be a member of the club to participate. There are no attendance requirements or prior skating skills required.

British Roller Derby Championships 
In 2016 both the women's A team and the men's team achieved promotion in the British Championships tournament, the men into tier 3 and the women into premier tier 1.

Their 2017 season was featured in the local press.

On 16 September 2018, the Co-Ed All-Stars beat the North Wales Men's team to gain promotion into Tier 2 of the British Championships. This game was streamed on BBC Sport, a first for the team.

Bouts

The table below lists the bouts played by the Bristol Roller Derby's travel teams – the Harbour Harlots

References

Roller derby in England
Roller derby leagues in the United Kingdom
Roller derby leagues established in 2010
Sports competitions in Bristol
2010 establishments in England